Paracelsus-Bad is a Berlin U-Bahn station located on the .
Designed by R.G. Rümmler and opened in 1987, it was named after the philosopher Paracelsus and the nearby bath bearing his name. The walls are covered with white tiles and black borders, and also several pictures with bathing scenes. The columns are also covered with black and white panels, playing with old architecture of baths.

References 

U8 (Berlin U-Bahn) stations
Buildings and structures in Reinickendorf
Railway stations in Germany opened in 1987